The Ministry of Basic, Higher and Technical Education (MBHTE), is the regional executive department of the Bangsamoro Autonomous Region in Muslim Mindanao (BARMM) responsible for affairs relating to education in the region. It is tasked to establish, maintain, and support a complete and integrated system of quality education in the Bangsamoro.

History
The Ministry of Basic, Higher and Technical Education of Bangsamoro was formed by absorbing the function of various regional offices of the Philippine national government for the Autonomous Region in Muslim Mindanao (ARMM). This offices include that of the Department of Education (DepEd), the Commission on Higher Education (CHED), and the Technical Education and Skills Development Authority (TESDA). The ARMM is the predecessor government of the Bangsamoro Autonomous Region in Muslim Mindanao (BARMM).

When the ARMM was succeeded by the Bangsamoro Autonomous Region in Muslim Mindanao (BARMM) in 2019, the regional departments of the former ARMM were reconfigured into ministries of Bangsamoro. Mohagher Iqbal was appointed on February 26, 2019 by interim Chief Minister Murad Ebrahim as the newly reconfigured Bangsamoro department's first minister.

Relations with national government
The Bangsamoro education ministry entered into an agreement with the Commission on Higher Education (CHED) of the Philippine national government in April 2019. Under the agreement CHED will provide technical assistance to BARMM to improve the state and accessibility of higher education in the region.

Ministers

References

Bangsamoro
Basic, Higher, and Technical Education